Damian de Allende (born 25 November 1991) is a South African professional rugby union player who currently plays for the South Africa national team and Japanese club Saitama Wild Knights. His usual position is either centre or wing. He was a member of the Springboks team that won a record-equalling third Rugby World Cup in 2019.

Club career
He made his first team debut for Western Province during the 2012 Vodacom Cup, in their game against . He made a total of three appearances in that campaign, scoring one try. He was then also included in the squad for the 2012 Currie Cup Premier Division.

He further extended his contract with the Stormers in July 2017 which saw him remain until the end of the 2019 season. De Allende represented the Ikey Tigers in the 2012 Varsity Cup.

After the 2019 Rugby World Cup, where de Allende was a member of the victorious South African team, he joined Japanese Top League side Saitama Wild Knights. De Allende joined Irish United Rugby Championship side Munster, whose head coach was former Springboks forwards coach Johann van Graan. Though de Allende's two-year contract didn't officially commence until 1 July 2020, he arrived in Ireland in May 2020 after the cancellation of the remainder of the 2019–20 Top League and completed two weeks of isolation due to the COVID-19 pandemic.

De Allende made his debut for Munster in their 27–25 defeat against Leinster on 22 August 2020, and scored his first try for the province in their 52–3 win against Italian side Zebre in round 8 of the 2020–21 Pro14 on 30 November 2020. He made his Champions Cup debut for the province in their opening fixture of the 2020–21 competition against English side Harlequins on 13 December 2020, starting in Munster's 21–7 home win. De Allende was named in the 2020–21 Pro14 Dream Team in his first season with Munster.

De Allende left Munster at the end of the 2021–22 season,. and returned to Japan to rejoin League One club Saitama Wild Knights, for whom de Allende had previously played for during 2019–20.

International career

In May 2014, De Allende was one of eight uncapped players that were called up to a Springbok training camp prior to the 2014 mid-year rugby union tests. He was subsequently named in the final squad, but suffered a medial knee ligament injury and had to withdraw from the squad.

However, he was once again selected in the Springboks' next squad for the 2014 Rugby Championship and was named in the starting line-up for their opening match of this competition against  in Pretoria.

In 2015, he was selected in the starting XV of a South African side against the World XV for a game held on 11 July 2015. He scored two tries in the game, earning praise from the World XV and former Australia coach Robbie Deans, who commented that "Damian has been playing remarkable rugby the whole year and he keeps doing the right things. He can add a new dimension to the Boks".

Having only been on the field for 13 minutes, De Allende was controversially red-carded in the 75th minute of New Zealand's 25–24 win against South Africa on 8 October 2017 for a late hit on first-five Lima Sopoaga, intending to charge down Sopoaga's attempted drop goal. De Allende was not suspended, as SANZAAR stated he should not have received red for the attempted charge down.

De Allende was named in South Africa's squad for the 2019 Rugby World Cup. South Africa went on to win the tournament, defeating England in the final. De Allende started in all three tests for South Africa during the 2021 British & Irish Lions tour to South Africa, earning his 50th cap for the Springboks during their third test victory that sealed a series win for the home team, and garnering widespread praise for his performances during the series.

Statistics

Super Rugby statistics

Springboks test match record

Correct as of 26 November 2022

Notes

References

External links
 
 

Living people
1991 births
White South African people
Rugby union players from Cape Town
South African rugby union players
South Africa international rugby union players
Stormers players
South African people of Spanish descent
Western Province (rugby union) players
Hanazono Kintetsu Liners players
Saitama Wild Knights players
Munster Rugby players
South African expatriate rugby union players
South African expatriate sportspeople in Japan
Expatriate rugby union players in Japan
Rugby union wings
Rugby union centres